Khvordeh Darreh (also Romanized as Khowr Deh Darreh and Khowrdeh Darreh) is a village in Harm Rural District, Juyom District, Larestan County, Fars Province, Iran. At the 2006 census, its population was 224, in 40 families.

References 

Populated places in Larestan County